Pride & Prejudice is a 2005 romantic drama film directed by Joe Wright, in his feature directorial debut, and based on Jane Austen's 1813 novel of the same name. The film features five sisters from an English family of landed gentry as they deal with issues of marriage, morality and misconceptions. Keira Knightley stars in the lead role of Elizabeth Bennet, while Matthew Macfadyen plays her romantic interest Mr. Darcy.

Screenwriter Deborah Moggach initially attempted to make her script as faithful to the novel as possible, writing from Elizabeth's perspective while preserving much of the original dialogue. Wright encouraged greater deviation from the text, including changing the dynamics within the Bennet family. Wright and Moggach set the film in an earlier period and avoided depicting a "perfectly clean Regency world", presenting instead a "muddy hem version" of the time. It was shot entirely on location in England on an 11-week schedule. Wright found casting difficult due to past performances of particular characters. The filmmakers had to balance who they thought was best for each role with the studio's desire for stars. Knightley was well known in part from her role in the Pirates of the Caribbean film series, while Macfadyen had no international name recognition.

Produced by Working Title Films in association with StudioCanal, Pride & Prejudice was released on 16 September 2005 in the United Kingdom and on 11 November in the United States. The film's themes emphasise realism, romanticism and family. It was marketed to a younger, mainstream audience; promotional items noted that it came from the producers of 2001's romantic comedy Bridget Jones's Diary before acknowledging its provenance as an Austen novel. Pride & Prejudice earned a worldwide gross of approximately $121 million, a commercial success. It received generally positive reviews, and also received four nominations at the 78th Academy Awards, including Best Actress in a Leading Role for 20-year-old Knightley, making her the third-youngest Best Actress nominee at the time. Austen scholars have opined that Wright's work created a new hybrid genre by blending traditional traits of the heritage film with "youth-oriented filmmaking techniques".

Plot 

During the late 18th century, Mr. and Mrs. Bennet and their daughters – Jane, Elizabeth, Mary, Kitty, and Lydia – live at Longbourn, their estate in rural England. Mrs. Bennet, eager to secure suitable marriages for her daughters, is delighted when wealthy bachelor Charles Bingley moves into nearby Netherfield. At an assembly ball, Bingley, his sister, Caroline, and his friend Mr. Darcy meet the local society. Bingley and Jane are immediately taken with each other, while Elizabeth instantly dislikes the snobbish Darcy and overhears his dismissive remarks about her.

Later, visiting the Bingleys, Jane falls ill and must stay to recuperate. While Elizabeth is visiting Jane at Netherfield, she verbally spars with the haughty Caroline and the aloof Darcy. Jane recovers and soon after, Mr. Bennet's cousin, Mr. Collins, a pompous clergyman, visits the Bennets; as the closest male relative, Collins will inherit Longbourn. Mr. Collins intends to propose to Jane, but Mrs. Bennet says she will soon be engaged; she suggests Elizabeth, which Collins considers an agreeable alternative. The Bennet sisters also meet the handsome and charming soldier, Lieutenant Wickham, who is connected to the Darcy family. He wins Elizabeth's sympathy by claiming Mr. Darcy denied him his rightful inheritance.

At the Netherfield ball, Elizabeth dances with Darcy, though the encounter is strained. The next day, Collins proposes to Elizabeth, who soundly rejects him; despite her mother's anger, her father supports her decision. The Bingley party unexpectedly return to London. Elizabeth urges Jane to visit their aunt and uncle, the Gardiners, who live in London, hoping she reconnects with Bingley. Elizabeth is astonished when her friend, Charlotte, fearing spinsterhood, announces her engagement to Mr. Collins.

Months later, Elizabeth visits Charlotte and Mr. Collins, who reside on Lady Catherine de Bourgh's estate. Elizabeth unexpectedly meets Darcy, who is Lady Catherine's nephew, and is visiting with his cousin, Colonel Fitzwilliam. Unaware that Jane is Elizabeth's sister, Fitzwilliam mentions that Darcy recently untangled Bingley from an imprudent match with an "unsuitable" family.

Distraught, Elizabeth is then met by Darcy, who surprisingly proposes marriage, declaring his ardent love despite her inferior rank. Offended and angry, she refuses him. He defends separating Jane and Bingley, believing Jane indifferent, and rightly criticizes the other Bennets' occasional social impropriety. Elizabeth also cites his mistreating Wickham. Angry and heartbroken, Darcy later delivers Elizabeth a letter describing Wickham's true character: Wickham squandered the bequest Darcy's father left him, then attempted to seduce Darcy's 15-year-old sister, Georgiana, into eloping to gain her fortune.

Elizabeth returns home, as does Jane. Accompanying the Gardiners on a trip to the Peak District, Elizabeth reluctantly tours Pemberley, the grand Darcy estate. She unexpectedly runs into Darcy, who invites her and the Gardiners to dine at Pemberley. Darcy's manner has softened considerably, his manners impressing the Gardiners, and Georgiana sharing her brother's flattering reports about Elizabeth.

An urgent letter from Jane reveals that Lydia has run off with Wickham. Darcy leaves abruptly, and Elizabeth returns home, certain she will never see Darcy again. Her mother fears Lydia's disgrace will ruin her other daughters' chances for good marriages. After a tense waiting period, Mr. Gardiner sends news that Lydia and Wickham are now married, and the newlyweds return to Longbourn. Lydia lets slip to Elizabeth that it was Darcy who found them and paid for their wedding. He also purchased Wickham's military commission.

Bingley and Darcy return to Netherfield and visit Longbourn; Bingley proposes to Jane, who accepts. Late that night, Lady Catherine arrives to see Elizabeth and demands she never become engaged to Darcy because, she claims, Darcy has been engaged to marry Lady Catherine's daughter since infancy; deeply insulted, Elizabeth orders her to leave. Walking the moor early the next morning, Elizabeth encounters Darcy, who apologizes for his aunt's intrusion. He professes his continued love, and Elizabeth, her feelings radically altered, accepts his proposal. She tells her father the truth of Darcy's actions, and Mr. Bennet gives Elizabeth his consent to marry, overjoyed she has found love.

Cast

Production

Conception and adaptation 
As with several recent Jane Austen adaptations, Pride & Prejudice was an Anglo-American collaboration, between British studio Working Title Films (in association with French company StudioCanal) and its American parent company Universal Studios. Working Title at the time was known for mainstream productions like Bridget Jones's Diary and Love Actually that drew international audiences, rather than films in the historical drama genre. Its co-chairman Tim Bevan explained that the studio wanted to "bring Austen's original story, concentrating on Lizzie, back in all its glory to the big screen for audiences everywhere to enjoy". Given a "relatively inexpensive" budget of £22 million ($28 million), the film was expected to excel at the box office, particularly based on the commercial successes of Romeo + Juliet (1996) and Shakespeare in Love (1998) as well as the resurgence of interest in Austen's works.

Given little instruction from the studio, screenwriter Deborah Moggach spent over two years adapting Pride and Prejudice for film. She had sole discretion with the early script, and eventually wrote approximately ten drafts. Realising it held "a perfect three-act structure", Moggach attempted to be as faithful to the original novel as possible, calling it "so beautifully shaped as a story – the ultimate romance about two people who think they hate each other but who are really passionately in love. I felt, 'If it's not broken, don't fix it.'" While she could not reproduce the novel's "fiercely wonderful dialogue in its entirety", she attempted to keep much of it.

Moggach's first script was closest to Austen's book, but later versions trimmed extraneous storylines and characters. Moggach initially wrote all scenes from Elizabeth's point of view in keeping with the novel; she later set a few scenes from the male perspective, such as when Bingley practices his marriage proposal, to "show Darcy and Bingley being close" and to indicate Darcy was a "human being instead of being stuck up". Small details were inserted that acknowledged wider events outside of the characters' circle, such as those then occurring in France. While Moggach is the only screenwriter credited for the film, playwright Lee Hall also made early additions to the script.

Television director Joe Wright was hired in early 2004, making Pride & Prejudice his feature film directorial debut. He was considered a surprising choice for a film in the romance drama genre due to his past work with social realism. Wright's body of work had impressed the producers, who were looking for a fresh perspective; they sent him a script despite the fact that Wright had not read the novel. He commented that at the time, "I didn't know if I was really all that interested; I thought I was a little bit more mainstream than this, a bit more edgy. But then I read the script and I was surprised I was very moved by it". He next read the novel, which he called "an amazing piece of character observation and it really seemed like the first piece of British Realism. It felt like it was a true story; had a lot of truth in it about understanding how to love other people, understanding how to overcome prejudices, understanding the things that separate us from other people ... things like that."

The only adaptation of Pride and Prejudice Wright had seen was the 1940 production, which was the last time the novel had been adapted into a feature film. The director purposely did not watch the other productions, both out of fear he would inadvertently steal ideas and because he wanted to be as original as possible. He did, however, watch other period films, including Ang Lee's Sense and Sensibility, Roger Michell's Persuasion, and John Schlesinger's Far from the Madding Crowd; Wright cited this last film as the greatest influence on his own adaptation, calling it "very real and very honest – and it is quite romantic as well". In trying to create an atmosphere of charged flirtation, the director also gained inspiration from teen romance films such as Sixteen Candles and The Breakfast Club.

Wright's hire occurred while Moggach was on her third draft. Despite her desire to work closely with Austen's dialogue, Wright made an effort to not "be too reverential to [it]. I don't believe people spoke like that then; it's not natural." While a few scenes, such as the discussion over accomplished women, aligned closely with the author's original dialogue, many others "substituted instead a mixture of modern idiom and archaic-sounding sentence structure". One alteration concerned politeness; Wright noted that while Austen's work had characters waiting before speaking, he believed that "particularly in big families of girls, everyone tends to speak over each other, finishing each other's sentences, etc. So I felt that the Bennet family's conversations would be overlapping like that." Sense and Sensibility actress and screenwriter Emma Thompson aided in script development, though she opted to be uncredited. She advised the nervous director about adapting Austen for the screen and made dialogue recommendations, such as with parts of the Collins-Charlotte storyline.

Citing the year Austen first wrote a draft of the novel, Wright and Moggach changed the period setting from 1813 (the novel's publication date) to the late eighteenth century; this decision was partly because Wright wanted to highlight the differences within an England influenced by the French Revolution, as he was fascinated that it had "caused an atmosphere among the British aristocracy of fear". Additionally, Wright chose the earlier period because he hated dresses with an empire silhouette, which were popular in the later period. The decision helped make the film visually distinct from other recent Austen adaptations. In comparison to the popular 1995 BBC version, which featured Colin Firth and Jennifer Ehle, producer Paul Webster desired to make an adaptation that "doesn't conform to the television drama stereotypes of a perfect clean Regency world". Wright and Moggach opted for a "muddy hem version" of Longbourn, presenting a more rural setting than in previous adaptations out of a desire to depict the Bennets in "very close proximity to their rural life" and to emphasise their relative poverty. While the degree of poverty was criticised by some critics, Wright felt that the "mess adds to the drama of the predicament that the family were in", and helps contrast the Bennets, Darcys, and Bingleys.

Casting 

Wright found casting of the film to be difficult because he was very particular about "the types of people [he] wanted to work with". While interviewing to direct, he insisted that the actors match the ages of the characters in the novel. Wright specifically cast actors that had rapport on and off screen, and insisted that they partake in three weeks of rehearsal in improvisation workshops. Wright also had to balance who he thought was best for each role with what the producers wanted – mainly a big name attraction. Though Wright had not initially pictured someone as attractive as English actress Keira Knightley for the lead role of Elizabeth Bennet, he cast her after realising that the actress "is really a tomboy [and] has a lively mind and a great sense of humour". Knightley at the time was known for Bend It Like Beckham and the Pirates of the Caribbean film series. She had been an Austen fan since age 7, but initially feared taking the role out of apprehension that she would be doing "an absolute copy of Jennifer Ehle's performance", which she deeply admired. Knightley believed Elizabeth is "what you aspire to be: she's funny, she's witty and intelligent. She's a fully rounded and very much loved character." For the period, the actress studied etiquette, history and dancing but ran into trouble when she acquired a short haircut while preparing for her role in the bounty hunter film Domino.

Webster found the casting of Darcy especially hard due to the character's iconic status and because "Colin Firth cast a very long shadow" as the 1995 Darcy. Wright later commented that his choice of Knightley allowed him to cast comparative unknown Matthew Macfadyen, something that would have been impossible had he chosen a less well-known actress for Elizabeth Bennet. Macfadyen at the time was known for his role in the British television spy series Spooks, but had no recognition internationally. A fan of the actor's television work, Wright called Macfadyen "a proper manly man ... I didn't want a pretty boy kind of actor. His properties were the ones I felt I needed [for Darcy]. Matthew's a great big hunk of a guy."

According to Wright, Rosamund Pike was cast as the eldest sister "because [he] knew she wasn't going to play her as a nice, simple person. Jane has a real interior world, she has her heart broken." Despite being Pike's ex-boyfriend, Simon Woods was cast as her romantic interest Mr Bingley. The other three Bennet sisters were played by Talulah Riley, Carey Mulligan, and Jena Malone, the only American actress among them. Wright believed Malone to have a "pretty faultless English accent". Mulligan heard about the casting call at a dinner hosted by Julian Fellowes, to whom she had written a letter after failing to get into drama school; she won the part after three auditions. Tamzin Merchant appears as Georgiana Darcy; she was hired despite having no previous acting experience after she wrote a letter to the casting director. In addition to Merchant, Pride & Prejudice was the feature film debut of both Mulligan and Riley.

Donald Sutherland reminded Wright of his own father and was cast as the Bennet patriarch; Wright thought the actor possessed the "strength to handle those six women". Brenda Blethyn was hired to play Mrs Bennet, whom Moggach believed to be the unsung heroine of the film; Wright explained that it was "a tricky part [to fill], as she can be very annoying; you want to stop her chattering and shrieking. But Brenda has the humour and the heart to show the amount of love and care Mrs Bennet has for her daughters." Wright convinced veteran actress Judi Dench to join the cast as Lady Catherine de Bourgh by writing her a letter that read "I love it when you play a bitch. Please come and be a bitch for me." Dench had only one week available to shoot her scenes, forcing Wright to make them his first days of filming.

Costume design 

Known for her BAFTA award-winning work on the 2004 film Vera Drake, Jacqueline Durran was hired as the costume designer. She and Wright approached his film "as a difficult thing to tackle" because of their desire to distinguish it from the television adaptation. Due to Wright's dislike of the high waistline, Durran focused on later eighteenth century fashions that often included a corseted, natural waistline rather than an empire silhouette (which became popular after the 1790s). A generational divide was established: the older characters dress in mid-eighteenth century fashions while the young wear "a sort of proto-Regency style of hair and dress".

Durran's costumes also helped emphasise social rank among the different characters; Caroline Bingley for instance is introduced in an empire silhouetted dress, clothing that would have then been at the height of fashion. During her interview, Durran opined that all the women wear white at the Netherfield Ball due to its contemporary popularity, an idea that Wright credits as his reason for hiring her. Costumes and hairstyles were adjusted to appeal to contemporary audiences, sacrificing historical accuracy.

To help differentiate the Bennet sisters, Durran viewed Elizabeth as the "tomboy", clothing her in earthy colours because of her love of the countryside. For the other sisters, Durran remarked, "Jane was the most refined and yet it's still all a bit slapdash and homemade, because the Bennets have no money. One of the main things Joe wanted was for the whole thing to have a provincial feel. Mary is the bluestocking: serious and practical. And then Lydia and Kitty are a bit Tweedledum and Tweedledee in a kind of teenage way. I tried to make it so that they'd be sort of mirror images. If one's wearing a green dress, the other will wear a green jacket; so you always have a visual asymmetry between the two." In contrast to the 1940 film, the 2005 production displayed the Bennet sisters in worn-down but comfortable dresses.

Mr Darcy's costume went through a series of phases. Durran noted:

Filming 

Moggach believed the novel was very filmable, "despite it containing no description and being a very unvisual book". To Wright, many other period films had relied on paintings for inspiration rather than photographs, causing them to appear unreal. He thus used "Austen's prose [to give him] many visual references for the people in the story", including using close-up shots of various characters. The filmmakers also changed several scenes to more romantic locales than those in the book. For instance, in the film, Darcy first proposes outdoors in a rainstorm at a building with neoclassical architecture; in the book, this scene takes place inside a parsonage. In the film, his second proposal occurs on the misty moors as dawn breaks; in the book, he and Elizabeth are walking down a country lane in broad daylight. Wright has acknowledged that "there are a lot of period film clichés; some of them are in the film and some are not, but for me it was important to question them".

During script development, the crew created a "constant going back and forth between script and location". The film was shot entirely on location within England on an 11-week schedule during the 2004 summer. Co-producer Paul Webster noted that "it is quite unusual for a movie this size to be shot entirely on location. Part of Joe [Wright]'s idea was to try to create a reality which allows the actors to relax and feel at one with their environment." Working under production designer Sarah Greenwood and set decorator Katie Spencer, the crew filmed on seven estates in six different counties. Because "nothing exists in the United Kingdom that is untouched by the twenty-first century", many of the sites required substantial work to make them suitable for filming. Visual effects company Double Negative digitally restored several locations to make them contemporaneous; they eradicated weeds, enhanced gold plating on window frames, and removed anachronisms such as gravel driveways and electricity pylons. Double Negative also developed the typeface used for the film's title sequence.

Production staff selected particularly grand-looking residences to better convey the wealth and power of certain characters. Locations included Chatsworth House in Derbyshire, the largest privately held country house in England with its spectacular rooms frescoed by Antonio Verrio. Chatsworth House is often believed to have been Austen's inspiration for the Darcy residence. Chatsworth and Wilton House in Salisbury stood in for Pemberley. After a search of various sites in England, the moated manor house Groombridge Place in Kent was chosen for Longbourn. Location manager Adam Richards believed Groombridge had an "immense charm" that was "untouched by post-17th Century development". Reflecting Wright's choice of realism, Groombridge's interior was designed to be "shabby chic". Representing Netherfield Park was the late-18th century site Basildon Park in Berkshire, leading it to close for seven weeks to allow time for filming. Burghley House in Cambridgeshire stood in for Rosings, while the adjacent town of Stamford served as Meryton. Other locations included Haddon Hall (for The Inn at Lambton), the Temple of Apollo and Palladian Bridge of Stourhead (for the Gardens of Rosings), Hunsford (for Collins' parsonage and church) and Peak District (for Elizabeth and the Gardiners' tour). The first dance scenes were shot on a set in a potato warehouse in Lincolnshire with the employment of local townspeople as extras; this was the only set the crew built that was not already in existence.

Music 

Italian composer Dario Marianelli wrote the film score. The soundtrack is performed by the French pianist Jean-Yves Thibaudet accompanied by the English Chamber Orchestra.

The early piano sonatas of Ludwig van Beethoven "became a point of reference" and "starting point" for the original score. Some pieces were inspired by the film's period, with the assumption that they could conceivably have been heard during that time and contained actual dance cues that were fitting for the late eighteenth century. Pieces that actors perform were composed first, before filming began.

The soundtrack ultimately contained seventeen instrumental tracks of music organised in a different way from the film.

Editing 

In contrast to the five-hour BBC adaptation, Wright compressed his film into two hours and nine minutes of screen time. He remarked that the film is "obviously about Elizabeth and Darcy, following them and anything that detracts or diverts you from that story is what you have to cut". Some of the most notable changes from the original book include time compression of several major sequences, including the departure of Wickham and the militia, Elizabeth's visit to Rosings Park and Hunsford Parsonage, Elizabeth's visit to Pemberley, Lydia's elopement and subsequent crisis; the elimination of several supporting characters, including Mr and Mrs Hurst, Mr and Mrs Phillips, Lady and Maria Lucas, Mrs Younge, several of Lydia's friends (including Colonel and Mrs Forster) and various military officers and townspeople; and the elimination of several sections in which characters reflect or converse on events that have recently occurred—for example, Elizabeth's chapter-long change of mind after reading Darcy's letter.

Moggach and Wright debated how to end the film, but knew they did not want to have a wedding scene "because we didn't want Elizabeth to come off as the girl who became a queen at this lavish wedding, or for it to be corny". Shortly before the North American release, the film was modified to include a final scene (not in the novel) of the married Darcys enjoying a romantic evening and passionate kiss at Pemberley in an attempt to attract sentimental viewers; this became a source of complaint for the Jane Austen Society of North America (JASNA). After watching a preview of the film before its wide release, former JASNA president Elsa Solender commented, "It has nothing at all of Jane Austen in it, is inconsistent with the first two-thirds of the film, insults the audience with its banality and ought to be cut before release". It had been removed from the British version after preview audiences found it unintentionally humorous; however, later audiences complained that they were excluded from viewing this version, causing the film to be re-released in the UK and Ireland 10 weeks after the original UK premiere date. The original British version ended with Mr Bennet's blessing upon Elizabeth and Darcy's union, thus circumventing the last chapter in the novel, which summarises the lives of the Darcys and the other main characters over the next several years.

Major themes and analysis

Romanticism and realism 
Film, literary, and Austen scholars noted the appearance of romance and romanticism within Pride & Prejudice, especially in comparison to previous adaptations. Sarah Ailwood marked the film as "an essentially Romantic interpretation of Austen's novel", citing as evidence Wright's attention to nature as a means to "position Elizabeth and Darcy as Romantic figures ... Wright's Pride & Prejudice takes as its central focus Austen's concern with exploring the nature of the Romantic self and the possibilities for women and men to achieve individual self-fulfillment within an oppressive patriarchal social and economic order." Likewise, Catherine Stewart-Beer of Oxford Brookes University called Elizabeth's presence on the Derbyshire cliff a "stunning, magical evocation of Wright's strong stylistic brand of Postmodern Romanticism", but found this less like Austen and more reminiscent of Emily Brontë's Wuthering Heights. In her analysis, University of Provence scholar Lydia Martin concluded that the "Romantic bias of the film is shown through the shifts in the characters' relationships, the soundtrack and the treatment of landscape".

Realism is a prominent aspect of the film, a theme confirmed by Wright in interviews as well as the DVD audio commentary. In a 2007 article, Ursinus College film studies professor Carole Dole argued that Pride & Prejudice is "a hybrid that embraces both an irreverent realism to which younger audiences are accustomed (and which reflects the director's realist aesthetic) and the classic heritage film's reverence for country houses, attractive landscapes and authentic period detail". Such "irreverent realism" included the depiction of Longbourn as a working farm complete with chickens, cattle and pigs; as Dole explains, "The agricultural realities of 1790s England are equally evident in the enclosed yard with barn and hay where Lizzie twirls barefoot over the mud on a rope swing". Referring to recent adaptations such as 1999's gritty Mansfield Park, Dole cited Pride & Prejudice as evidence that the heritage film is still around but has "been transformed into a more flexible genre". Jessica Durgan agreed with this assessment, writing that the film "simultaneously reject[s] and embrac[es] heritage to attract a larger audience".

Family 
Raised with three sisters, Moggach was particularly interested in the story's family dynamics. Brock University professor Barbara K. Seeber believed that in contrast to the novel, the 2005 adaptation emphasises the familial over the romantic. Evidence of this can be seen in how Pride & Prejudice "significantly recast the Bennet family, in particular its patriarch, presenting Mr Bennet as a sensitive and kind father whose role in the family's misfortunes is continually downplayed." Seeber further observed that the film is "the first to present Mrs Bennet in a sympathetic light", with Mr Bennet displayed as "an attentive husband as well as a loving father."

Stewart-Beer and Austen scholar Sally B. Palmer noted alterations within the depiction of the Bennet family; Stewart-Beer remarked that while their family home "might be chaotic, in this version it is, at heart, a happy home—much happier and much less dysfunctional, than Austen's original version of Longbourn ... For one, Mr and Mrs Bennet actually seem to like each other, even love each other, a characterisation which is a far cry from the source text." Producer Paul Webster acknowledged the familial theme in the DVD featurette "A Bennet Family Portrait", remarking "Yes, it's a great love story between Elizabeth Bennet and Fitzwilliam Darcy, but underpinning it all is the kind of love that runs this family."

Depiction of Elizabeth Bennet 
Wright intended for the film to be "as subjective as possible" in being from Elizabeth's perspective; the audience first glimpses Darcy when she does. This focus on Elizabeth features some dramatic changes from the novel. Knightley's Elizabeth has an "increasingly aloof and emotionally distant" relationship with her family. Evidence of this can be seen with Elizabeth's gradual alienation from Jane as the film progresses; this is in contrast to the book, where Elizabeth confides more of her feelings to Jane after difficult events. Wright wanted to create a "real" relationship between the two sisters and have them grow apart, as he thought the book depicted them as too "syrupy." Moggach's intent was for Elizabeth to "keep secrets to herself. They are a great burden to her ... As she keeps all this to herself, we feel for her more and more. The truest comedy, I believe, is born from pain."

In her "feisty, impassioned" interactions with Darcy and "rebellious refusal to 'perform'" for Lady Catherine, Stewart-Beer sees Knightley's depiction as "far removed from Austen's original Elizabeth, who has a greater sense of grounded maturity, even though both Elizabeths have an occasional inclination to fluster, fun and giggles." According to George Washington University professor Laurie Kaplan, while Wright's focus on Elizabeth is consistent with the novel, the screenplay removed her line of self-recognition: "Till this moment, I never knew myself". Kaplan characterises the sentence as Elizabeth's "most important", and believes its deletion "violates not only the spirit and the essence of Austen's story but the viewer's expectations as well."

Release

Marketing 
After a string of Jane Austen semi-adaptions in the late 1990s and early 2000s, Pride & Prejudice was positioned to take audiences "back into the world of period drama and what many saw as a more authentic version of Austen." While the novel was known to audiences, the large number of related productions required the film to distinguish itself. It was marketed to attract mainstream, young viewers, with one observer referring to it as "the ultimate chick-flick romance" and "more commercial than previous big-screen Austen adaptations." Another wrote that it brings "millennial girlhood to the megaplex ... If Ehle's Lizzie is every forty-, or fifty-something's favorite independent, even 'mature,' Austen heroine, Knightley is every twenty-something's sexpot good girl." An ampersand replaced the word "and" in the film title, similar to the 1996 postmodern film Romeo + Juliet.

Already a star at the time of release, Knightley's appearance in the film was emphasised by featuring her in all promotional materials (similar to Colin Firth's prominent appearance in the 1995 adaptation). Several commentators likened the main poster of Pride & Prejudice to that of 1995's Sense and Sensibility, which was seen as an attempt to attract the same demographic. Advertising noted that the film came "from the producers of Bridget Jones's Diary", a 2001 romantic comedy film, before mentioning Austen. Leading up to the release, fans were allowed to download pictures and screensavers online, which emphasised the differences between Pride & Prejudice and previous adaptations. Lydia Martin wrote that in contrast to past Pride and Prejudice productions, marketing materials downplayed the "suggested antagonism between the heroes" in favour of highlighting a "romantic relationship", as can be seen with the positioning of the characters as well as with the tagline, "Sometimes the last person on earth you want to be with is the one you can't be without."

Box office 
On 11 September 2005, Pride & Prejudice premiered at the Toronto International Film Festival as a special Gala Presentation. The film was released in cinemas on 16 September in the United Kingdom and Ireland. It achieved the number one spot in its first week, earning £2.5 million ($4.6 million) while playing on 397 screens. The film stayed at the top for two more weeks, earning by then a total of over £9 million at the UK box office. It was featured on 412 screens at its widest domestic release.

On 11 November 2005, the film debuted in the United States with an opening weekend of $2.9 million on 215 screens. Two weeks later, it played on 1,299 screens and box office returns increased to $7.2 million; the film left cinemas the week of 24 February 2006 with a total US gross of $38,405,088. Jack Foley, the president of distribution of Focus Features, the film's US distributor, attributed Pride & Prejudices success in America to Austen's appeal to "the boomer market" and its status as a known "brand".

Pride & Prejudice was released in an additional fifty-nine countries between September 2005 and May 2006 by United International Pictures. With a worldwide gross of $121,147,947, it was the 72nd highest-grossing film of 2005 in the US and was the 41st highest internationally.

Home media 
In the US and UK, Universal Studios Home Entertainment released the standard VHS and DVD in February 2006 for both widescreen and fullframe; attached bonus features included audio commentary by director Joe Wright, a look into Austen's life and the ending scene of Elizabeth and Darcy kissing. On 13 November 2007, Universal released the deluxe edition DVD to coincide with the theatrical arrival of Wright's 2007 film Atonement. The deluxe edition included both widescreen and fullscreen features, the original soundtrack CD, a collectible book and booklet, as well as a number of special features not included in the original DVD. In the US, a Blu-ray version of the film was released by Universal on 26 January 2010, which also contained bonus features.

Reception 

Pride & Prejudice was only the second film version after "the famed, but oddly flawed, black-and-white 1940 adaptation, starring Greer Garson and Laurence Olivier", and until 2005, The Times considered the 1995 television adaptation "so dominant, so universally adored, [that] it has lingered in the public consciousness as a cinematic standard." Wright's film consequently met with some scepticism from admirers of Austen, especially in relation to plot changes and casting choices. "Any resemblance to scenes and characters created by Miss Austen is, of course, entirely coincidental," mocked The New Yorker's film critic. Given Austen's characters were landed gentry, especially criticised was the re-imagining of the Bennetts as country bumpkins, lacking even the basics of table manners, and their home "a barnyard".

Comparing six major adaptations of Pride and Prejudice in 2005, The Daily Mirror gave the only top marks of 9 out of 10 to the 1995 serial and the 2005 film, leaving the other adaptations behind with six or fewer points. On the review aggregation website Rotten Tomatoes, the film has a "certified fresh" approval rating of 86% based on reviews from 182 critics, with an average rating of 7.7/10. The website's consensus reads: "Sure, it's another adaptation of cinema's fave Jane Austen novel, but key performances and a modern filmmaking sensibility make this familiar period piece fresh and enjoyable." On Metacritic the film has an average score of 82 out of 100, based on 37 reviews, indicating the film received "universal acclaim".  Audiences surveyed by CinemaScore gave the film a grade A− on scale of A to F.

Critics claimed the film's time constraints did not capture the depth and complexity of the television serials and called Wright's adaptation "obviously [not as] daring or revisionist" as the serial. JASNA president Joan Klingel Ray preferred the young age of Knightley and Macfadyen, saying that Jennifer Ehle had formerly been "a little too 'heavy' for the role." Peter Bradshaw of The Guardian, while praising Knightley for an outstanding performance "which lifts the whole movie", considered the casting of the leads "arguably a little more callow than Firth and Ehle." He does add that "Only a snob, a curmudgeon, or someone with necrophiliac loyalty to the 1995 BBC version with Colin Firth and Jennifer Ehle could fail to enjoy [Knightley's] performance." At the time, BBC film critic Stella Papamichael considered it Knightley's "best performance yet." However, The Daily Telegraph critic thought Knightley's acting skills slight, in her view, "Someone who radiates little more than good-mannered perkiness", and that between her and Macfadyen there was "little spark".

Critics were divided about Macfadyen's portrayal of Darcy, expressing pleasant surprise, dislike for his lack of gradual emotional shift as in the novel, and praise for his matching the insecure and sensitive personality of the book character better than Firth.

Critics also drew attention to other aspects of the film. Writing for The Sydney Morning Herald, Sandra Hall criticised Wright's attention to realism for being "careless with the customs and conventions that were part of the fabric of Austen's world." In another review, Time Out magazine lamented the absence of Austen's "brilliant sense of irony", remarking that the film's "romantic melodrama's played up at the expense of her razor-sharp wit." More positively, Derek Elley of Variety magazine praised Wright and Moggach for "extracting the youthful essence" of the novel while also "providing a richly detailed setting" under Greenwood and Durran's supervision. Equally pleased with the film was the San Francisco Chronicles Ruthe Stein, who wrote that Wright made a "spectacular feature film debut" that is "creatively reimagined and sublimely entertaining". Claudia Puig of USA Today called it "a stellar adaptation, bewitching the viewer completely and incandescently with an exquisite blend of emotion and wit."

Accolades

Impact and legacy 
Wright's adaptation failed to have the same cultural impact as the 1995 serial and has since attracted sharply-divided opinions. However, even three years after the release, Knightley was still associated with Elizabeth Bennet among a generation of young viewers who had not seen the 1995 production. Given the varied opinions about the film, JASNA published an edited special issue of its online journal Persuasions On-Line in 2007 with the collaboration of nineteen Austen scholars from six countries; the intent was to foster discussion and stimulate scholarly analysis. JASNA had done this only once before, for the 1996 film Emma.

Pride & Prejudice impacted later productions in the costume drama and heritage film genres. Literary critics protested that Wright's adaptation effectively "popularized Austen's celebrated romance and brought her novel to the screen as an easy visual read for an undemanding mainstream audience." Carole Dole noted that the film's success "only made it more likely that future adaptations of Austen will feature, if not necessarily mud, then at least youthful and market-tested performers and youth-oriented filmmaking techniques balanced with the visual pleasures of the heritage film." She cited Anne Hathaway in the 2007 film Becoming Jane as an example. Jessica Durgan added that Pride & Prejudice conceived a new hybrid genre by rejecting the visual cues of the heritage film, which attracted "youth and mainstream audiences without alienating the majority of heritage fans."

Production of Pride & Prejudice began Wright's relationship with Working Title Films, the first of four collaborations. Many members of the film's cast and crew joined Wright in his later directorial efforts. For his adaptation of Atonement, which he viewed as "a direct reaction to Pride & Prejudice", Wright hired Knightley, Blethyn, Marianelli, Thibaudet, Greenwood, and Durran. Atonement employed themes similar to Austen's, including the notion of a young writer living in "an isolated English country house" who "mixes up desires and fantasies, truths and fiction." Wright's 2009 film The Soloist included Hollander, Malone, and Marianelli, while Hollander was also featured in Hanna (2011). Wright's 2012 adaptation of Anna Karenina features Knightley, Macfadyen, Marianelli, Durran, and Greenwood and is produced by Bevan, Eric Fellner, and Webster.

On 11 December 2017, Netflix announced that a person from Chile watched the film 278 times during the entire year. It was later reported that the person was a 51-year-old woman, who declared herself as "obsessed" with the film and saw Elizabeth Bennet as "a feminist icon".

See also 
 Jane Austen in popular culture
 Janeite
 List of literary adaptations of Pride and Prejudice
 2005 in film
 List of British films of 2005
 List of oldest and youngest Academy Award winners and nominees – Youngest nominees for Best Actress in a Leading Role
 78th Academy Awards
 63rd Golden Globe Awards
 59th British Academy Film Awards

Notes

References

Bibliography

Books

Essays and journals

Interviews

Newspaper and magazine articles

Online

Press releases

Visual media

External links 

 
 
 
 
 
 
 
 

2005 films
2000s historical romance films
2005 romantic drama films
American historical romance films
American romantic drama films
British historical romance films
British romantic drama films
2000s feminist films
Films based on Pride and Prejudice
Films directed by Joe Wright
Films produced by Tim Bevan
Films produced by Eric Fellner
Films scored by Dario Marianelli
Films set in country houses
Films shot in Berkshire
Films shot in Kent
Films shot in Wiltshire
English-language French films
French historical romance films
French romantic drama films
Romantic period films
StudioCanal films
Universal Pictures films
Working Title Films films
2005 directorial debut films
Films about sisters
Films shot in Derbyshire
2000s English-language films
2000s American films
2000s British films
2000s French films
Films set in the 18th century